František Černík (14 June 1900 – 21 July 1982) was a Czech water polo player. He competed in the men's tournament at the 1920 Summer Olympics.

References

External links
 

1900 births
1982 deaths
Czechoslovak male water polo players
Olympic water polo players of Czechoslovakia
Water polo players at the 1920 Summer Olympics
Sportspeople from Prague